Seymour Burr (1754/1762–1837) was an African-American slave in the Connecticut Colony in the North American British Colonies and United States. Owned by the brother of Colonel Aaron Burr, who was also named Seymour, he was known only as Seymour (sometimes spelled Seymore) until he escaped and used the surname Burr to enlist in the British Army in the early days of the American Revolution. The British promised the personal freedom of any African-American slave who enlisted or escaped to fight against the Continental Army, and Burr wanted more than anything to be free. However, he was quickly captured and forcibly returned to his owner.

His owner, fearing that Seymour would escape again, offered him his freedom at the end of the war if he paid over his Bounty Money after enlisting in the American Army; Seymour agreed to this bargain

Birth
There is conflicting information regarding his birth. Some citations list him as born in Connecticut, possibly of mixed-race parentage, others claim he was born in Guinea, Africa, captured at age seven, and was possibly of royal birth. A descriptive Feb 1782 document of enlisted men documents list his birthplace as "Guinea" with his age given as both 20 and 28, which places his birth in either 1754 or 1762.

Military service
It is alleged that he fought at Bunker Hill and Fort Catskill, and suffered through the long winter, at Valley Forge. However Massachusetts Archives show only that on the fifth of April 1781, Seymour enlisted in the 7th Massachusetts Regiment, led by Colonel John Brooks and served until Feb 1782.

Freedom and Marriage
After his service he was given the freedom he wanted. Then in 1805 he married a widow, Mary (Will) Wilbore, daughter of Nuff Will and Sarah Moho (Mohho), a Native American woman of the Ponkapoag tribe, and settled in what is now Canton, Massachusetts. He also collected a government pension for his military service. The couple had two daughters: Polly (Burr) Croud and Sally (Sarah). Both of his daughters died in Cambridge, Mass. An 1892 History of Canton reported that a grandson of Seymour Burr named Lemuel Burr was a resident of Boston, Mass.
The report is confirmed by two sources: 
1842 Boston City Directory:
Burr, Lemuel, barber, 65 Court, house 3 Southac  and a 
Burr, Sarah, widow, house 16 Belknap
In 1861 report to the Massachusetts Governor reports:
Sally Burr age 61 "Punkapogg" State beneficiary
Lemuel Burr age 45 "Punkapogg" Occupation Barber
along with wife and 4 children:
Mary Burr age 39 "Colored"
Ann E. Burr age 14 "Punkapogg"
Lemuel D. Burr age 12 "Punkapogg"
Mary M Burr age 6 "Punkapogg"
Sally L. Burr age 4 "Punkapogg"
An 1872 Cambridge Directory lists a Lemuel Burr as "Hairdresser"

Death
Seymour Burr died on February 17, 1837, and was buried in an unmarked grave in the Canton Corner, Canton, Mass., or at the graveyard at Burr Lane, Canton, Mass. His obituary was printed in the Liberator (Boston, MA), Feb. 25, 1837, p. 35:
DIED—In Canton, 17th inst. Mr. Semore Burr, (a colored man) aged 98. He was a soldier during the whole of the Revolutionary war. His widow died in 1852 at the age of either 98 or 101

See also
List of slaves

Publications

References

External links
A BRAVE AND GALLANT SOLDIER
Colored Patriots of the American Revolution
Peter Wood on black men during the Revolutionary War
The Ponkapoag Plantation

18th-century births
1837 deaths
18th-century American slaves
Continental Army soldiers
Black Patriots